was a city located in Saitama Prefecture, Japan.

As of April 1, 2011, the city had an estimated population of 61,781, with 26,902 households, and a population density of 9,932.64 per km2. The total area was 6.22 km2, the second smallest among all cities in Japan.

The city was founded on March 1, 1967.

On October 11, 2011, Hatogaya was merged into the expanded city of Kawaguchi.

References

External links

  

Dissolved municipalities of Saitama Prefecture
Kawaguchi, Saitama